Bruno Verges (born 1 November 1975) is a French former professional rugby league footballer who played as a er for the Catalans Dragons in the Super League.

References

1975 births
Living people
French rugby league players
Rugby league wingers
Catalans Dragons players
France national rugby league team players